Kuldeep Singh Vaid is an Indian politician and former IAS officer.

Early life 
K.S. Vaid was born to Sardar Gurcharan Singh Vaid and  Surjit Kaur Vaid. He did his B.Com. and LLB from Panjab University.

His son, Harkarandeep Singh Vaid is an elected member from Ward 44 in Ludhiana civic elections. He was married to Bhavdeep Kaur and his father-in-law, Jatinderpal Singh is also a PCS officer.

He is a 1992-batch PCS officer who got promoted as an I.A.S. in 2007. He served as D.C. of Moga and Additional Chief Administrator of Greater Ludhiana Area Development Authority (GLADA).

Positions Held 
He entered politics after resigning from civil services on 30 November 2016.

In 2017 Punjab Legislative Assembly elections he fought from Gill constituency.

He held positions as:  
Member of Committee on Public Accounts and House Committee
Member of Committee on Local Bodies and Panchayati Raj Institutions
Member of Committee on Privileges

References 

1961 births
Living people
Indian politicians